Maples is an unincorporated community in Jefferson Township, Allen County, in the U.S. state of Indiana.

History
A post office was established at Maples in 1854, and remained in operation until it was discontinued in 1921. The community was named for Lewis S. Maples, a lumber baron.

Geography

Notable people
 Lucy Fitch Perkins, author, was born in Maples.

References

External links

Unincorporated communities in Allen County, Indiana
Unincorporated communities in Indiana
Fort Wayne, IN Metropolitan Statistical Area